Paramorbia rostellana is a species of moth of the family Tortricidae. It has been reported in Costa Rica, Colombia, and Panama.

References

Moths described in 1877
Sparganothini
Moths of Central America